Kingsley Haldane Bugarin, OAM (born 3 August 1968) is an Australian Paralympic and vision impaired swimmer. He competed in five consecutive Summer Paralympics from 1984 to 2000, winning a total of five gold, eight silver, and six bronze medals. He held the Australian record for the highest Paralympic medal count until it was surpassed in 2012 by Matthew Cowdrey.

Personal
He was born 3 August 1968 in Mount Lawley, Western Australia. He attended La Salle College, Perth. Bugarin married Indonesian triathlete Yanti Ardie during the SunSmart IRONMAN at Busselton, Western Australia in December 2014. Bugarin works as an information technology consultant.

Swimming 
Before his swimming career, Bugarin competed in track and field. At the age of 14, he took up competitive swimming training at Swan Hills Swimming Club in Midvale, Western Australia.

As a 16-year-old at the 1984 New York Paralympics, he won two silver medals and a bronze medal. He followed this up with three bronze medals at 1988 Seoul Paralympics.

At the 1990 IPC Swimming Championships in Assen, he won one gold, two silver and won bronze medal. This was followed up with three silver medals and one bronze medal at 1992 Barcelona. At the 1994 IPC Swimming Championships in Valenta, he won one gold, two silver and one bronze medals.

At the 1996 Atlanta Paralympics, he had his most successful Paralympics winning three gold, two silver and one bronze medals. He won four gold medals at 1999 IPC Swimming World Championships in Madrid.

During the late 1990s in the lead up to the Sydney Paralympics Bugarin moved to Claremont Uni Swimming Club to train with Matt Brown at the UWA Aquatic Centre and then called, Challenge Stadium.

At his final Paralympics, he won two gold and one silver medal at the 2000 Sydney Paralympics.

At the end of his career, Bugarin's overall international medal tally shows a total of 32 gold medals, 19 silver medals and 13 bronze medals. Over the duration of his career, Bugarin has won a total of 155 medals in competitions ranging from National Championships to Paralympic Games.

As of May 2019, Bugarin holds the world record for the 200 m breaststroke in class S12 with a time of 2:34.08 which he set on 19 October 1999 in Perth.

Bugarin is officially retired from high level competition but still trains and competes in open water swimming and triathlon events.

He was an Australian Institute of Sport scholarship holder from 1997 to 1999 in swimming.

Achievements 

In 1997, he received the Order of Australia (OAM) in recognition of service to sport as a gold medallist at the Atlanta Paralympic Games 1996.

In 2000, he received an Australian Sports Medal.

In 2008 he was inducted into the Western Australian Swimming Association Hall of Fame.

In 2019, he was made a Legend of the Western Australian Swimming Association Hall of Fame. He was the third swimmer to be made a Legend.

References

External links 

 
 
 The Swan Hills Swimming Club

1968 births
Living people
Male Paralympic swimmers of Australia
Swimmers at the 1984 Summer Paralympics
Swimmers at the 1988 Summer Paralympics
Swimmers at the 1992 Summer Paralympics
Swimmers at the 1996 Summer Paralympics
Swimmers at the 2000 Summer Paralympics
Paralympic gold medalists for Australia
Paralympic silver medalists for Australia
Paralympic bronze medalists for Australia
Paralympic swimmers with a vision impairment
Recipients of the Medal of the Order of Australia
Recipients of the Australian Sports Medal
World record holders in paralympic swimming
Swimmers from Perth, Western Australia
Australian Institute of Sport Paralympic swimmers
People educated at La Salle College, Perth
Medalists at the 1984 Summer Paralympics
Medalists at the 1988 Summer Paralympics
Medalists at the 1992 Summer Paralympics
Medalists at the 1996 Summer Paralympics
Medalists at the 2000 Summer Paralympics
Australian blind people
Paralympic medalists in swimming
Australian male freestyle swimmers
Australian male breaststroke swimmers
S12-classified Paralympic swimmers
Medalists at the World Para Swimming Championships